Wawlay is a town in Myawaddy Township, Myawaddy District, in Kayin State, Myanmar.

References 

Populated places in Kayin State